This is a list of butterflies of the Central African Republic. About 597 species are known from the Central African Republic, 19 of which are endemic.

Papilionidae

Papilioninae

Papilionini
Papilio antimachus Drury, 1782
Papilio zalmoxis Hewitson, 1864
Papilio nireus Linnaeus, 1758
Papilio chrapkowskoides nurettini Koçak, 1983
Papilio sosia pulchra Berger, 1950
Papilio plagiatus Aurivillius, 1898
Papilio dardanus Brown, 1776
Papilio phorcas congoanus Rothschild, 1896
Papilio cyproeofila praecyola Suffert, 1904
Papilio mechowi Dewitz, 1881
Papilio mechowianus Dewitz, 1885

Leptocercini
Graphium antheus (Cramer, 1779)
Graphium policenes telloi Hecq, 1999
Graphium colonna (Ward, 1873)
Graphium illyris girardeaui Guilbot & Plantrou, 1978
Graphium angolanus baronis (Ungemach, 1932)
Graphium ridleyanus (White, 1843)
Graphium leonidas (Fabricius, 1793)
Graphium tynderaeus (Fabricius, 1793)
Graphium latreillianus theorini (Aurivillius, 1881)
Graphium adamastor (Boisduval, 1836)
Graphium agamedes (Westwood, 1842)
Graphium schubotzi (Schultze, 1913)
Graphium abri Smith & Vane-Wright, 2001 (endemic)
Graphium almansor escherichi (Gaede, 1915)
Graphium auriger (Butler, 1876)
Graphium hachei moebii (Suffert, 1904)
Graphium ucalegon (Hewitson, 1865)
Graphium simoni (Aurivillius, 1899)

Pieridae

Pseudopontiinae
Pseudopontia paradoxa (Felder & Felder, 1869)

Coliadinae
Eurema brigitta (Stoll, [1780])
Eurema hecabe solifera (Butler, 1875)
Catopsilia florella (Fabricius, 1775)

Pierinae
Colotis celimene sudanicus (Aurivillius, 1905)
Colotis euippe (Linnaeus, 1758)
Nepheronia pharis (Boisduval, 1836)
Leptosia alcesta (Stoll, [1782])
Leptosia bastini Hecq, 1997
Leptosia hybrida Bernardi, 1952
Leptosia marginea (Mabille, 1890)
Leptosia wigginsi pseudalcesta Bernardi, 1965

Pierini
Appias epaphia (Cramer, [1779])
Appias sabina (Felder & Felder, [1865])
Appias sylvia (Fabricius, 1775)
Mylothris agathina richlora Suffert, 1904
Mylothris chloris (Fabricius, 1775)
Mylothris rhodope (Fabricius, 1775)
Dixeia doxo (Godart, 1819)
Belenois aurota (Fabricius, 1793)
Belenois calypso dentigera Butler, 1888
Belenois solilucis Butler, 1874
Belenois subeida (Felder & Felder, 1865)
Belenois sudanensis pseudodentigera Berger, 1981
Belenois theora ratheo (Suffert, 1904)
Belenois theuszi (Dewitz, 1889)

Lycaenidae

Miletinae

Liphyrini
Euliphyra mirifica Holland, 1890
Aslauga purpurascens Holland, 1890

Miletini
Megalopalpus metaleucus Karsch, 1893
Megalopalpus zymna (Westwood, 1851)
Lachnocnema emperamus (Snellen, 1872)
Lachnocnema divergens Gaede, 1915
Lachnocnema vuattouxi Libert, 1996

Poritiinae

Liptenini
Alaena subrubra Bethune-Baker, 1915
Ptelina carnuta (Hewitson, 1873)
Pentila pauli leopardina Schultze, 1923
Telipna acraea nigrita Talbot, 1935
Telipna albofasciata Aurivillius, 1910
Telipna atrinervis Hulstaert, 1924
Telipna hollandi exsuperia Hulstaert, 1924
Telipna citrimaculata Schultze, 1916
Telipna sanguinea (Plötz, 1880)
Telipna consanguinea Rebel, 1914
Telipna nyanza katangae Stempffer, 1961
Telipna ruspinoides Schultze, 1923
Ornipholidotos ugandae goodi Libert, 2000
Ornipholidotos abriana Libert, 2005
Ornipholidotos amieti Libert, 2005
Ornipholidotos overlaeti fontainei Libert, 2005
Ornipholidotos gemina fournierae Libert, 2005
Ornipholidotos congoensis Stempffer, 1964
Ornipholidotos nbeti Libert, 2005
Ornipholidotos jax Collins & Larsen, 1998 (endemic)
Ornipholidotos paradoxa centralis Libert, 2005
Ornipholidotos mathildae uniformis Libert, 2005
Mimacraea abriana Libert & Collins, 2000
Mimeresia debora (Kirby, 1890)
Liptena lloydi Collins & Larsen, 2008
Liptena modesta (Kirby, 1890)
Obania subvariegata (Grose-Smith & Kirby, 1890)
Tetrarhanis ilala etoumbi (Stempffer, 1964)
Tetrarhanis stempfferi (Berger, 1954)
Falcuna synesia fusca Stempffer & Bennett, 1963
Larinopoda lircaea (Hewitson, 1866)
Eresiomera isca (Hewitson, 1873)
Eresiomera nancy Collins & Larsen, 1998
Eresiomera phillipi Collins & Larsen, 1998 (endemic)
Citrinophila erastus (Hewitson, 1866)
Argyrocheila undifera Staudinger, 1892

Epitolini
Iridana rougeoti Stempffer, 1964
Epitola urania Kirby, 1887
Epitola uranioides uranoides Libert, 1999
Cerautola ceraunia (Hewitson, 1873)
Cerautola crowleyi leucographa Libert, 1999
Cerautola miranda vidua (Talbot, 1935)
Cerautola semibrunnea (Bethune-Baker, 1916)
Cerautola hewitsoni (Mabille, 1877)
Cerautola hewitsonioides (Hawker-Smith, 1933)
Geritola cyanea (Jackson, 1964)
Geritola dubia (Jackson, 1964)
Geritola gerina (Hewitson, 1878)
Geritola goodii (Holland, 1890)
Geritola liana (Roche, 1954)
Geritola virginea (Bethune-Baker, 1904)
Geritola subargentea continua Libert, 1999
Stempfferia annae Libert, 1999
Stempfferia cercene (Hewitson, 1873)
Stempfferia cercenoides (Holland, 1890)
Stempfferia cinerea (Berger, 1981)
Stempfferia coerulea pierri Libert, 1999
Stempfferia congoana (Aurivillius, 1923)
Stempfferia ginettae Libert, 1999
Stempfferia gordoni (Druce, 1903)
Stempfferia insulana (Aurivillius, 1923)
Stempfferia marginata (Kirby, 1887)
Stempfferia similis Libert, 1999
Stempfferia sylviae Libert, 1999
Stempfferia tumentia (Druce, 1910)
Stempfferia zelza (Hewitson, 1873)
Cephetola catuna (Kirby, 1890)
Cephetola cephena (Hewitson, 1873)
Cephetola chari Libert & Collins, 1999 (endemic)
Cephetola eliasis epitolina Libert & Collins, 1999
Cephetola ghesquierei (Roche, 1954)
Cephetola godarti Libert & Collins, 1999 (endemic)
Cephetola izidori (Kielland & Congdon, 1998)
Cephetola karinae Bouyer & Libert, 1999 (endemic)
Cephetola kiellandi (Libert & Congdon, 1998)
Cephetola maculata (Hawker-Smith, 1926)
Cephetola mariae Libert, 1999
Cephetola orientalis (Roche, 1954)
Cephetola oubanguensis Libert & Collins, 1999 (endemic)
Cephetola ouesso (Jackson, 1962)
Cephetola pinodes budduana (Talbot, 1937)
Cephetola subgriseata (Jackson, 1964)
Cephetola sublustris (Bethune-Baker, 1904)
Cephetola vinalli (Talbot, 1935)
Cephetola viridana (Joicey & Talbot, 1921)
Epitolina dispar (Kirby, 1887)
Epitolina melissa (Druce, 1888)
Epitolina collinsi Libert, 2000
Epitolina catori ugandae Jackson, 1962
Epitolina larseni Libert, 2000
Hypophytala benitensis (Holland, 1890)
Hypophytala henleyi (Kirby, 1890)
Hypophytala hyetta latifascia Libert & Collins, 1999
Hewitsonia boisduvalii (Hewitson, 1869)
Hewitsonia inexpectata Bouyer, 1997

Aphnaeinae
Pseudaletis agrippina Druce, 1888
Pseudaletis camarensis Collins & Libert, 2007
Pseudaletis clymenus (Druce, 1885)
Pseudaletis lusambo Stempffer, 1961
Pseudaletis zebra Holland, 1891
Pseudaletis rileyi Libert, 2007
Pseudaletis antimachus (Staudinger, 1888)
Pseudaletis batesi Druce, 1910
Pseudaletis dolieri Collins & Libert, 2007
Cigaritis crustaria (Holland, 1890)
Zeritis neriene Boisduval, 1836
Zeritis pulcherrima Aurivillius, 1923
Axiocerses harpax ugandana Clench, 1963
Aphnaeus argyrocyclus Holland, 1890
Aphnaeus asterius Plötz, 1880
Aphnaeus orcas (Drury, 1782)

Theclinae
Oxylides albata (Aurivillius, 1895)
Syrmoptera caritas Libert, 2004 (endemic)
Hypolycaena antifaunus (Westwood, 1851)
Hypolycaena dubia Aurivillius, 1895
Hypolycaena lebona (Hewitson, 1865)
Hypolycaena nigra Bethune-Baker, 1914
Iolaus fontainei (Stempffer, 1956)
Iolaus icipe Collins & Larsen, 1998
Iolaus calisto (Westwood, 1851)
Iolaus catori Bethune-Baker, 1904
Iolaus kyabobo Larsen, 1996
Pilodeudorix mimeta (Karsch, 1895)
Pilodeudorix ula (Karsch, 1895)
Pilodeudorix virgata (Druce, 1891)
Pilodeudorix angelita (Suffert, 1904)
Pilodeudorix aruma aruma (Hewitson, 1873)
Pilodeudorix aruma pallidior Libert, 2004
Pilodeudorix leonina indentata Libert, 2004
Pilodeudorix otraeda genuba (Hewitson, 1875)
Pilodeudorix camerona (Plötz, 1880)
Pilodeudorix congoana (Aurivillius, 1923)
Pilodeudorix zela (Hewitson, 1869)
Pilodeudorix hugoi Libert, 2004
Pilodeudorix corruscans (Aurivillius, 1898)
Pilodeudorix deritas (Hewitson, 1874)
Pilodeudorix violetta (Aurivillius, 1897)
Paradeudorix cobaltina (Stempffer, 1964)
Paradeudorix ituri (Bethune-Baker, 1908)
Paradeudorix marginata (Stempffer, 1962)
Paradeudorix petersi (Stempffer & Bennett, 1956)
Hypomyrina mimetica Libert, 2004
Deudorix dinochares Grose-Smith, 1887
Deudorix dinomenes diomedes Jackson, 1966
Deudorix kayonza Stempffer, 1956
Deudorix lorisona (Hewitson, 1862)
Deudorix odana Druce, 1887

Polyommatinae

Lycaenesthini
Anthene irumu (Stempffer, 1948)
Anthene lachares lachares (Hewitson, 1878)
Anthene lachares toroensis Stempffer, 1947
Anthene larydas (Cramer, 1780)
Anthene leptines (Hewitson, 1874)
Anthene locuples (Grose-Smith, 1898)
Anthene lysicles (Hewitson, 1874)
Anthene scintillula (Holland, 1891)
Anthene starki Larsen, 2005
Anthene sylvanus (Drury, 1773)
Anthene lamprocles (Hewitson, 1878)
Anthene lusones (Hewitson, 1874)
Anthene rufoplagata (Bethune-Baker, 1910)
Cupidesthes robusta Aurivillius, 1895

Polyommatini
Cupidopsis jobates mauritanica Riley, 1932
Uranothauma falkensteini (Dewitz, 1879)
Phlyaria cyara (Hewitson, 1876)
Tuxentius carana (Hewitson, 1876)
Euchrysops cyclopteris (Butler, 1876)
Euchrysops reducta Hulstaert, 1924
Euchrysops sagba Libert, 1993
Thermoniphas fumosa Stempffer, 1952
Thermoniphas togara (Plötz, 1880)
Oboronia guessfeldti (Dewitz, 1879)
Oboronia punctatus (Dewitz, 1879)
Lepidochrysops parsimon (Fabricius, 1775)

Nymphalidae

Danainae

Danaini
Danaus chrysippus alcippus (Cramer, 1777)
Amauris niavius (Linnaeus, 1758)
Amauris hecate (Butler, 1866)
Amauris vashti (Butler, 1869)

Satyrinae

Elymniini
Elymniopsis bammakoo (Westwood, [1851])

Melanitini
Gnophodes betsimena parmeno Doubleday, 1849
Gnophodes chelys (Fabricius, 1793)
Melanitis ansorgei Rothschild, 1904

Satyrini
Bicyclus alboplaga (Rebel, 1914)
Bicyclus angulosa (Butler, 1868)
Bicyclus auricruda fulgidus Fox, 1963
Bicyclus dubia (Aurivillius, 1893)
Bicyclus ephorus bergeri Condamin, 1965
Bicyclus golo (Aurivillius, 1893)
Bicyclus hewitsoni (Doumet, 1861)
Bicyclus ignobilis eurini Condamin & Fox, 1963
Bicyclus italus (Hewitson, 1865)
Bicyclus mandanes Hewitson, 1873
Bicyclus medontias (Hewitson, 1873)
Bicyclus mollitia (Karsch, 1895)
Bicyclus pavonis (Butler, 1876)
Bicyclus sambulos (Hewitson, 1877)
Bicyclus sandace (Hewitson, 1877)
Bicyclus sangmelinae Condamin, 1963
Bicyclus sebetus (Hewitson, 1877)
Bicyclus sophrosyne (Plötz, 1880)
Bicyclus sweadneri Fox, 1963
Bicyclus taenias (Hewitson, 1877)
Bicyclus trilophus jacksoni Condamin, 1961
Hallelesis asochis congoensis (Joicey & Talbot, 1921)
Ypthima doleta Kirby, 1880

Charaxinae

Charaxini
Charaxes varanes vologeses (Mabille, 1876)
Charaxes fulvescens fulvescens (Aurivillius, 1891)
Charaxes fulvescens monitor Rothschild, 1900
Charaxes protoclea protonothodes van Someren, 1971
Charaxes boueti Feisthamel, 1850
Charaxes cynthia kinduana Le Cerf, 1923
Charaxes lucretius intermedius van Someren, 1971
Charaxes lactetinctus Karsch, 1892
Charaxes jasius brunnescens Poulton, 1926
Charaxes epijasius Reiche, 1850
Charaxes castor (Cramer, 1775)
Charaxes octavus , 1972 (endemic)
Charaxes brutus angustus Rothschild, 1900
Charaxes pollux (Cramer, 1775)
Charaxes eudoxus mechowi Rothschild, 1900
Charaxes richelmanni Röber, 1936
Charaxes numenes aequatorialis van Someren, 1972
Charaxes fuscus (Charaxes × fuscus) Plantrou, 1967 (endemic) - a natural hybrid between Charaxes numenes × probably Charaxes cynthia
Charaxes tiridates tiridatinus Röber, 1936
Charaxes bipunctatus ugandensis van Someren, 1972
Charaxes mixtus Rothschild, 1894
Charaxes smaragdalis Butler, 1866
Charaxes imperialis albipuncta Joicey & Talbot, 1920
Charaxes ameliae Doumet, 1861
Charaxes pythodoris occidens van Someren, 1963
Charaxes hadrianus Ward, 1871
Charaxes lecerfi Lathy, 192
Charaxes nobilis Druce, 1873
Charaxes superbus Schultze, 1909
Charaxes acraeoides Druce, 1908
Charaxes fournierae Le Moult, 1930
Charaxes zingha (Stoll, 1780)
Charaxes etesipe (Godart, 1824)
Charaxes achaemenes monticola van Someren, 1970
Charaxes eupale latimargo Joicey & Talbot, 1921
Charaxes subornatus Schultze, 1916
Charaxes anticlea proadusta van Someren, 1971
Charaxes hildebrandti (Dewitz, 1879)
Charaxes virilis van Someren & Jackson, 1952
Charaxes catachrous van Someren & Jackson, 1952
Charaxes etheocles ochracea van Someren & Jackson, 1957
Charaxes bocqueti oubanguiensis , 1975
Charaxes cedreatis Hewitson, 1874
Charaxes viola picta van Someren & Jackson, 1952
Charaxes kheili Staudinger, 1896
Charaxes pleione congoensis Plantrou, 1989
Charaxes paphianus Ward, 1871
Charaxes kahldeni Homeyer & Dewitz, 1882
Charaxes nichetes Grose-Smith, 1883
Charaxes lycurgus bernardiana Plantrou, 1978
Charaxes zelica rougeoti Plantrou, 1978
Charaxes porthos Grose-Smith, 1883
Charaxes doubledayi Aurivillius, 1899
Charaxes mycerina nausicaa Staudinger, 1891
Charaxes bernardii , 1978 (endemic)

Euxanthini
Charaxes eurinome ansellica (Butler, 1870)
Charaxes crossleyi (Ward, 1871)
Charaxes trajanus (Ward, 1871)

Pallini
Palla publius centralis van Someren, 1975
Palla ussheri dobelli (Hall, 1919)
Palla violinitens coniger (Butler, 1896)

Apaturinae
Apaturopsis cleochares (Hewitson, 1873)

Nymphalinae
Kallimoides rumia jadyae (Fox, 1968)

Nymphalini
Junonia stygia (Aurivillius, 1894)
Junonia westermanni Westwood, 1870
Junonia cymodoce lugens (Schultze, 1912)
Salamis cacta (Fabricius, 1793)
Protogoniomorpha anacardii (Linnaeus, 1758)
Protogoniomorpha parhassus (Drury, 1782)
Protogoniomorpha temora (Felder & Felder, 1867)
Precis ceryne (Boisduval, 1847)
Precis coelestina Dewitz, 1879
Precis octavia (Cramer, 1777)
Precis sinuata Plötz, 1880
Hypolimnas anthedon (Doubleday, 1845)
Hypolimnas dinarcha (Hewitson, 1865)
Hypolimnas macarthuri Neidhoefer, 1972 (endemic)
Hypolimnas mechowi (Dewitz, 1884)
Hypolimnas misippus (Linnaeus, 1764)

Cyrestinae

Cyrestini
Cyrestis camillus (Fabricius, 1781)

Biblidinae

Biblidini
Mesoxantha ethosea ethoseoides Rebel, 1914
Ariadne albifascia (Joicey & Talbot, 1921)
Ariadne enotrea suffusa (Joicey & Talbot, 1921)
Ariadne pagenstecheri (Suffert, 1904)
Eurytela alinda Mabille, 1893

Epicaliini
Sevenia boisduvali omissa (Rothschild, 1918)
Sevenia garega (Karsch, 1892)
Sevenia pechueli sangbae (Hecq & Peeters, 1992)

Limenitinae

Limenitidini
Cymothoe aramis (Hewitson, 1865)
Cymothoe beckeri theodosia Staudinger, 1890
Cymothoe caenis (Drury, 1773)
Cymothoe capella (Ward, 1871)
Cymothoe colmanti Aurivillius, 1898
Cymothoe confusa Aurivillius, 1887
Cymothoe excelsa Neustetter, 1912
Cymothoe fumana balluca Fox & Howarth, 1968
Cymothoe haynae diphyia Karsch, 1894
Cymothoe herminia (Grose-Smith, 1887)
Cymothoe hesiodotus Staudinger, 1890
Cymothoe hobarti candidata Overlaet, 1954
Cymothoe hypatha (Hewitson, 1866)
Cymothoe indamora (Hewitson, 1866)
Cymothoe jodutta ciceronis (Ward, 1871)
Cymothoe lucasii binotorum Darge, 1985
Cymothoe lurida hesione Weymer, 1907
Cymothoe oemilius (Doumet, 1859)
Cymothoe reginaeelisabethae belgarum Overlaet, 1952
Cymothoe reinholdi vitalis Rebel, 1914
Cymothoe weymeri Suffert, 1904
Cymothoe zenkeri Richelmann, 1913
Pseudoneptis bugandensis ianthe Hemming, 1964
Pseudacraea boisduvalii (Doubleday, 1845)
Pseudacraea dolomena (Hewitson, 1865)
Pseudacraea eurytus (Linnaeus, 1758)
Pseudacraea lucretia protracta (Butler, 1874)
Pseudacraea semire (Cramer, 1779)

Neptidini
Neptis jamesoni Godman & Salvin, 1890
Neptis morosa Overlaet, 1955
Neptis nicobule Holland, 1892
Neptis nicomedes Hewitson, 1874
Neptis strigata Aurivillius, 1894
Neptis trigonophora melicertula Strand, 1912

Adoliadini
Catuna angustatum (Felder & Felder, 1867)
Catuna oberthueri Karsch, 1894
Euryphura athymoides Berger, 1981
Euryphura chalcis (Felder & Felder, 1860)
Euryphura plautilla (Hewitson, 1865)
Euryphurana nobilis (Staudinger, 1891)
Cynandra opis bernardii Lagnel, 1967
Euriphene hecqui Collins & Larsen, 1997
Euriphene atossa (Hewitson, 1865)
Euriphene barombina (Aurivillius, 1894)
Euriphene grosesmithi (Staudinger, 1891)
Euriphene schultzei (Aurivillius, 1909)
Euriphene doriclea (Drury, 1782)
Bebearia carshena (Hewitson, 1871)
Bebearia absolon (Fabricius, 1793)
Bebearia micans (Aurivillius, 1899)
Bebearia zonara (Butler, 1871)
Bebearia mandinga (Felder & Felder, 1860)
Bebearia oxione squalida (Talbot, 1928)
Bebearia cocalioides Hecq, 1988
Bebearia paludicola Holmes, 2001
Bebearia sophus (Fabricius, 1793)
Bebearia staudingeri carensis Collins & Larsen, 2008
Bebearia plistonax (Hewitson, 1874)
Bebearia phranza fuscara Hecq, 1989
Bebearia laetitia vesta Hecq, 1989
Bebearia flaminia (Staudinger, 1891)
Bebearia denticula Hecq, 2000
Bebearia demetra obsolescens (Talbot, 1928)
Bebearia tessmanni (Grünberg, 1910)
Bebearia cutteri camiadei Hecq, 2002
Bebearia eliensis (Hewitson, 1866)
Bebearia barombina (Staudinger, 1896)
Bebearia aurora wilverthi (Aurivillius, 1898)
Bebearia braytoni (Sharpe, 1907)
Bebearia chloeropis (Bethune-Baker, 1908)
Bebearia makala (Bethune-Baker, 1908)
Bebearia peetersi Hecq, 1994
Bebearia pulchella Hecq, 2006 (endemic)
Bebearia raeveli Hecq, 1989
Euphaedra rubrocostata (Aurivillius, 1897)
Euphaedra lupercoides Rothschild, 1918
Euphaedra clio Hecq, 1981
Euphaedra zaddachii elephantina Staudinger, 1891
Euphaedra hewitsoni bipuncta Hecq, 1974
Euphaedra hollandi Hecq, 1974
Euphaedra caerulescens caerulescens Grose-Smith, 1890
Euphaedra caerulescens caliginosa Hecq, 2004
Euphaedra camiadei Hecq, 2004 (endemic)
Euphaedra cyparissa aurata Carpenter, 1895
Euphaedra cyparissa nominalina Pyrcz & Knoop, 2013
Euphaedra eberti Aurivillius, 1896
Euphaedra janetta campaspoides Hecq, 1985
Euphaedra janetta remota Hecq, 1991
Euphaedra campaspe (Felder & Felder, 1867)
Euphaedra sarita (Sharpe, 1891)
Euphaedra viridicaerulea inanoides Holland, 1920
Euphaedra preussi Staudinger, 1891
Euphaedra procera Hecq, 1984
Euphaedra albofasciata Berger, 1981
Euphaedra mayumbensis Hecq, 1984
Euphaedra fascinata Hecq, 1984
Euphaedra miranda Hecq, 1984
Euphaedra simplex Hecq, 1978
Euphaedra hybrida Hecq, 1978
Euphaedra subferruginea Guillaumin, 1976
Euphaedra sangbae Hecq, 1996 (endemic)
Euphaedra edwardsii (van der Hoeven, 1845)
Euphaedra ruspina (Hewitson, 1865)
Euphaedra harpalyce spatiosa (Mabille, 1876)
Euphaedra losinga losinga (Hewitson, 1864)
Euphaedra losinga wardi (Druce, 1874)
Euptera choveti Amiet & Collins, 1998
Euptera collinsi Chovet & Libert, 1998 (endemic)
Euptera crowleyi centralis Libert, 1995
Euptera ducarmei Collins, 1998
Euptera falsathyma Schultze, 1916
Euptera pluto (Ward, 1873)
Euptera schultzei Libert & Chovet, 1998
Euptera semirufa Joicey & Talbot, 1921
Pseudathyma callina (Grose-Smith, 1898)
Pseudathyma cyrili Chovet, 2002
Pseudathyma endjami Libert, 2002
Pseudathyma michelae Libert, 2002

Heliconiinae

Acraeini
Acraea endoscota Le Doux, 1928
Acraea leucographa Ribbe, 1889
Acraea neobule Doubleday, 1847
Acraea quirina (Fabricius, 1781)
Acraea egina (Cramer, 1775)
Acraea sykesi Sharpe, 1902
Acraea alciope Hewitson, 1852
Acraea althoffi rubrofasciata Aurivillius, 1895
Acraea aurivillii Staudinger, 1896
Acraea serena (Fabricius, 1775)
Acraea jodutta (Fabricius, 1793)
Acraea orestia Hewitson, 1874
Acraea pelopeia Staudinger, 1896
Acraea vesperalis Grose-Smith, 1890
Acraea orinata Oberthür, 1893
Acraea peetersi Pierre, 1992 (endemic)
Acraea atatis Pierre, 2004 (endemic)

Vagrantini
Lachnoptera anticlia (Hübner, 1819)
Phalanta eurytis (Doubleday, 1847)
Phalanta phalantha aethiopica (Rothschild & Jordan, 1903)

Hesperiidae

Coeliadinae
Coeliades bixana Evans, 1940
Coeliades forestan (Stoll, [1782])
Coeliades hanno (Plötz, 1879)
Coeliades pisistratus (Fabricius, 1793)

Pyrginae

Celaenorrhinini
Celaenorrhinus chrysoglossa (Mabille, 1891)
Celaenorrhinus illustris (Mabille, 1891)
Celaenorrhinus meditrina (Hewitson, 1877)
Celaenorrhinus ovalis Evans, 1937
Celaenorrhinus rutilans (Mabille, 1877)
Eretis lugens (Rogenhofer, 1891)
Sarangesa brigida sanaga Miller, 1964
Sarangesa majorella (Mabille, 1891)
Sarangesa thecla (Plötz, 1879)

Tagiadini
Tagiades flesus (Fabricius, 1781)
Eagris hereus (Druce, 1875)
Eagris subalbida aurivillii (Neustetter, 1927)
Eagris tetrastigma (Mabille, 1891)
Eagris tigris liberti Collins & Larsen, 2005
Calleagris lacteus (Mabille, 1877)
Calleagris landbecki (Druce, 1910)
Procampta rara Holland, 1892
Abantis ja Druce, 1909
Abantis leucogaster (Mabille, 1890)
Abantis rubra Holland, 1920

Hesperiinae

Aeromachini
Gorgyra afikpo Druce, 1909
Gorgyra aretina (Hewitson, 1878)
Gorgyra bule Miller, 1964
Gorgyra diversata Evans, 1937
Gorgyra heterochrus (Mabille, 1890)
Gorgyra kalinzu Evans, 1949
Gorgyra mocquerysii Holland, 1896
Gorgyra pali Evans, 1937
Gorgyra rubescens Holland, 1896
Gorgyra sara Evans, 1937
Teniorhinus ignita (Mabille, 1877)
Ceratrichia argyrosticta (Plötz, 1879)
Ceratrichia flava Hewitson, 1878
Ceratrichia nothus yakoli Collins & Larsen, 2003
Ceratrichia semilutea Mabille, 1891
Ceratrichia semlikensis Joicey & Talbot, 1921
Pardaleodes edipus (Stoll, 1781)
Pardaleodes sator pusiella Mabille, 1877
Pardaleodes tibullus (Fabricius, 1793)
Pardaleodes xanthopeplus Holland, 1892
Xanthodisca astrape (Holland, 1892)
Rhabdomantis galatia (Hewitson, 1868)
Rhabdomantis sosia (Mabille, 1891)
Osmodes adonia Evans, 1937
Osmodes banghaasii Holland, 1896
Osmodes costatus Aurivillius, 1896
Osmodes hollandi Evans, 1937
Osmodes laronia (Hewitson, 1868)
Osmodes lindseyi Miller, 1964
Osmodes lux Holland, 1892
Osmodes omar Swinhoe, 1916
Osmodes thora (Plötz, 1884)
Parosmodes lentiginosa (Holland, 1896)
Paracleros substrigata (Holland, 1893)
Osphantes ogowena (Mabille, 1891)
Acleros mackenii olaus (Plötz, 1884)
Acleros nigrapex Strand, 1913
Semalea arela (Mabille, 1891)
Semalea atrio (Mabille, 1891)
Semalea sextilis (Plötz, 1886)
Hypoleucis sophia Evans, 1937
Meza banda (Evans, 1937)
Meza cybeutes (Holland, 1894)
Meza mabea (Holland, 1894)
Paronymus budonga (Evans, 1938)
Paronymus nevea (Druce, 1910)
Paronymus xanthias (Mabille, 1891)
Andronymus caesar (Fabricius, 1793)
Andronymus evander (Mabille, 1890)
Andronymus helles Evans, 1937
Andronymus hero Evans, 1937
Andronymus neander (Plötz, 1884)
Zophopetes ganda Evans, 1937
Gamia abri Miller & Collins, 1997 (endemic)
Gamia buchholzi (Plötz, 1879)
Mopala orma (Plötz, 1879)
Gretna balenge (Holland, 1891)
Gretna carmen Evans, 1937
Gretna cylinda (Hewitson, 1876)
Gretna zaremba (Plötz, 1884)
Pteroteinon caenira (Hewitson, 1867)
Pteroteinon capronnieri (Plötz, 1879)
Pteroteinon concaenira Belcastro & Larsen, 1996
Leona binoevatus (Mabille, 1891)
Leona lota Evans, 1937
Leona stoehri (Karsch, 1893)
Leona halma Evans, 1937
Leona lissa Evans, 1937
Caenides xychus (Mabille, 1891)
Caenides dacela (Hewitson, 1876)
Caenides hidaroides Aurivillius, 1896
Caenides dacena (Hewitson, 1876)
Monza alberti (Holland, 1896)
Melphina noctula (Druce, 1909)
Melphina tarace (Mabille, 1891)
Melphina unistriga (Holland, 1893)
Fresna carlo Evans, 1937
Fresna cojo (Karsch, 1893)
Fresna netopha (Hewitson, 1878)
Platylesches chamaeleon (Mabille, 1891)

Baorini
Borbo perobscura (Druce, 1912)

Heteropterinae
Metisella tsadicus (Aurivillius, 1905)

See also
List of moths of the Central African Republic
Wildlife of the Central African Republic
Geography of the Central African Republic
List of ecoregions in the Central African Republic

References

Seitz, A. Die Gross-Schmetterlinge der Erde 13: Die Afrikanischen Tagfalter. Plates
Seitz, A. Die Gross-Schmetterlinge der Erde 13: Die Afrikanischen Tagfalter. Text 

Butterflies

Central African Republic
Central African Republic
Butterflies